HD 106906 is a binary star system in the southern constellation of Crux. It is too faint to be visible to the naked eye, having a combined apparent visual magnitude of 7.80. The distance to this system is approximately 337 light years based on parallax, and it is receding from the Sun with a radial velocity of +10 km/s. It is a member of the Lower Centaurus–Crux group of the Scorpius–Centaurus OB association of co-moving stars.

This is a double-lined spectroscopic binary system consisting of two F-type main-sequence stars with similar masses and a matching stellar classification of F5 V. Their orbital period is less than 100 days.

Planetary system
An infrared excess around the binary is coming from a circumstellar debris disk that is being viewed edge-on. This has a pronounced asymmetrical shape, extending 120 AU on the east side and out to 550 AU to the west. Planetary orbit is inclined to the debris disk by 39 degrees, and planet itself is visible nearly pole-on, having a large axial tilt.

References 

F-type main-sequence stars
Spectroscopic binaries
Planetary systems with one confirmed planet
Circumstellar disks
Lower Centaurus Crux
Crux (constellation)
Durchmusterung objects
106906
059960
J12175319-5558319